Haskin is a lunar impact crater located on the lunar far side near the northern pole. The crater is located Southwest of the Hevesy crater and the Plaskett crater; the latter of which is located directly adjacent to the large Rozhdestvenskiy crater. The crater was adopted and named after American chemist Larry Haskin by the IAU in 2009.

References

 
 
 
 
 
 
 
 
 
 
 
 

Impact craters on the Moon